Shardul Amarchand Mangaldas & Company (also known as SAM & Co) is a full-service Indian law firm. The Firm came into existence on May 11, 2015, from its predecessor Amarchand & Mangaldas & Suresh A Shroff.

SAM & Co is known for its practices in mergers & acquisitions, private equity, competition law, insolvency & bankruptcy, dispute resolution, capital markets, banking & finance and projects & infrastructure.1

With 118 partners and offices spread across seven locations in India, the firm regularly advises some of the largest MNCs, Private Equity Funds and Indian corporate houses.2

Locations 
The Firm has pan-India presence with offices in Delhi, Mumbai, Gurugram, Bangalore, Chennai, Ahmedabad and Kolkata.3

Management 

Shardul S. Shroff is the Executive Chairman, and Pallavi S Shroff and Akshay Chudasama are the Managing Partners of the Firm.4

Practice areas 
·        Mergers & Acquisitions

·        Joint Ventures

·        Private Equity & Funds

·        Banking & Finance

·        Insolvency & Bankruptcy

·        Real Estate

·        Insurance

·        Competition Law

·        Dispute Resolution: Litigation and Arbitration

·        White Collar Crimes

·        Capital Markets

·        Compliance & Investigation

·        Projects and Projects Finance

·        Tax

·        Employment and Labour

·        Technology, Media & Telecommunication

·        Intellectual Property

·        Private Client Practice 5

·        Environmental Law

·        Venture Capital

Work 
The firm his active in various segments of the industry and business.6 It has represented transnational corporates on their India entry and business strategy, with services in merger & acquisition, tax, competition law, dispute resolution & arbitration, regulatory litigation, capital markets and private equity practices, amongst other practice areas. The competition practice is SAM's major practice area.

SAM has been involved in many complex transactions and dispute resolution cases .78 Firm's briefs have included advising Walmart on its US$16 billion acquisition of a controlling stake in Flipkart. It also advised a committee of creditors on insolvencies in which Tata Steel acquired a 72.65% controlling stake in Bhushan Steel, and is currently representing Punjab National Bank as it tries to recover from a US$1.4 billion fraud involving jeweller Nirav Modi.910

More recently, the Firm acted as Legal Counsel in the Reliance- Future Group deal.1112

Awards and recognition 
Shardul Amarchand Mangaldas & Company is an exclusive member firm of Lex Mundi in India, which helps its client's access services through the largest law firm network across more than 125 countries.13

Chambers & Partners Asia Pacific has recognised SAM & Co as the “India National Firm of the Year” in the year 2017 and 2020 with 10 Band 1 practices, 6 Band 1 Lawyers and 32 Ranked Lawyers (highest Band 1 practices and ranked lawyers for an Indian law Firm). For the year 2021, it is ranked again with highest number of Band 1 practices and highest number of Ranked Lawyers.14

The Legal 500 recognised 11 practice areas as Tier 1, Asia Law Profiles recognised 12 practice areas and sectors of SAM Co as outstanding, with International Financial Law Review (“IFLR”) recognising SAM Co as a Top Tier Firm in 2020. Further, India Business Law Journal recognised SAM Co as the “Law Firm of the Year” for two years in a row 2019 and 2020.15

In 2019, the Firm was recognised as the Most Innovative National Law Firm of 2019 by the IFLR, Country Law Firm of the Year India by Who's Who Legal, India Law Firm of the Year’ at the Asian Legal Business (ALB) India Law Awards 2019 and ‘Indian Law Firm of the Year’ at the Legal Era's Indian Legal Awards, 2019.16

The Firm was ranked #1 in deal count and deal value in Mergermarket annual India league table in 2018 and 2019, and is the only Indian law Firm to record over 100 deals for 2 years in a row until date. Shardul Shroff was recognised as Asia's best lawyer for 2020 by IFLR.17

References
1.https://www.mondaq.com/company/26280/Shardul-Amarchand-Mangaldas-Co

2.https://chambers.com/law-firm/shardul-amarchand-mangaldas-co-asia-pacific-8:22854445

3.https://www.iflr1000.com/Firm/Shardul-Amarchand-Mangaldas-Co-India/Profile/11725#undefined

4.https://www.legal500.com/firms/34518-shardul-amarchand-mangaldas-co/35126-mumbai-india/

5.https://www.amsshardul.com/all-services/

6. https://www.livemint.com/Companies/DMjEYc7DQsSKqkR2lMzARK/How-Shardul-Amarchand-revamped-its-structure.html

7.https://law.asia/india-top-law-firms-2019/

8. https://www.rediff.com/money/special/how-shardul-shroff-built-indias-top-law-firm/20181127.htm

9.https://www.businesstoday.in/sectors/banks/nirav-modi-case-pnb-fraud-11400-crore-scam-ed-cbi-raid/story/270708.html

10.https://www.thehindu.com/topic/PNB-Nirav_Modi_case/

11.https://www.cnbctv18.com/finance/future-group-deal-ril-says-shardul-amarchand-mangaldas-ey-deloitte-among-advisors-6788221.htm

12.https://www.iflr1000.com/Firm/Shardul-Amarchand-Mangaldas-Co-India/Profile/11725#undefined

13.https://economictimes.indiatimes.com/industry/services/consultancy-/-audit/lex-mundi-announces-shardul-amarchand-as-their-india-member/articleshow/48176537.cms?from=mdr

14.https://chambers.com/law-firm/shardul-amarchand-mangaldas-co-asia-pacific-8:22854445

15.https://www.amsshardul.com/awards-recognitions/

16.https://www.iflr1000.com/Firm/Shardul-Amarchand-Mangaldas-Co/Profile/11725#profile

17.https://www.iflr.com/article/b1nltyrxc3prqn/to-succeed-in-india-one-has-to-be-very-patient-and-vigilant

18. ^ "Breaking: AZB partner Shuva Mandal defects to Shardul Amarchand". Legally India. Retrieved 9 September 2015.

19.    ^ Ganz, Kian. "Shardul Amarchand Mangaldas started today with new logo & cupcakes, as brothers migrate Amarchand.com [UPDATE-1: BRAND EXPLAINED]". LegallyIndia.  Retrieved 11 May 2015.

20. ^ Jump up to:a b "Law firm Shardul Amarchand Mangaldas starts operations". Business Standard. Press Trust of India. 11 May 2015. Retrieved 11 May 2015.   ^ "Shardul Amarchand Mangaldas & Co". Retrieved 11 May 2015.
^ Vyas, Maulik (12 May 2015). "We'll have over 450 partners by end of 2015: Shardul Shroff, Shardul Amarchand Mangaldas & Co". Economic Times. Retrieved 12 May 2015

External links 
Official website https://www.amsshardul.com

Law firms of India
Law firms established in 2015
2015 establishments in India